Communication privacy management (CPM), originally known as communication boundary management, is a systematic research theory designed to develop an evidence-based understanding of the way people make decisions about revealing and concealing private information. CPM theory suggests that individuals maintain and coordinate privacy boundaries (the limits of what they are willing to share) with various communication partners depending on the perceived benefits and costs of information disclosure. It was first developed by Sandra Petronio in 1991. She believes disclosing private information will strengthen the connections with those around you. through negotiating Privacy boundaries we can better understand the rules for disclosure in relationships.

Petronio uses a boundary metaphor to explain the privacy management process. Privacy boundaries draw divisions between private information and public information. This theory argues that when people disclose private information, they depend on a rule-based management system to control the level of accessibility. An individual's privacy boundary governs his or her
self-disclosures. Once a disclosure is made, the negotiation of privacy rules between the two parties is required. A
distressing sense of "boundary turbulence" can arise when
clashing expectations for privacy management are identified. Having the mental image of protective boundaries is central to understanding the five core principles of Petronio's CPM:

 People believe they own and have a right to control their private information. 
 People control their private information through the use of personal privacy rules. 
 When others are told or given access to a person's private information, they become co-owners of that information. 
 Co-owners of private information need to negotiate mutually agreeable privacy rules about telling others. 
 When co-owners of private information don't effectively negotiate and follow mutually held privacy rules, boundary turbulence is the likely result.

Background 
Petronio's communication privacy management (CPM) theory is built on Altman's dialectical
conception of privacy as a process of opening and closing a boundary to others. Altman and Taylor's social penetration theory focused on self-disclosure as the primary way to develop close relationships. However, openness is only part of the story. We also have a desire for privacy. When Petronio first developed this theory in 1991, it was called communication boundary management. In 2002, she renamed it to communication privacy management, underscoring private disclosure as the main thrust of the theory.

Theory elements

Private information 

The content of concealing and revealing is private information. Petronio favored the term "private information" over the term "self-disclosure" because there are many caveats inherent to private information disclosure that are not present with self-disclosure. Firstly, the motivations behind sharing are many, including but not limited to: sharing a burden, righting a wrong, and influencing others. Since private information can be about yourself or others, the decision as to what is private and whom to share it with plays a part when taking the idea of boundaries into consideration. The decision to share is ultimately left up to the process of the privacy rule management system which combines rules for coordination of information, characteristics of disclosure, and attributes of the nature of boundaries.
 Shareholder
A confident who is fully committed to handle private information by abiding in the original owners privacy rules</ref> A First Look at Communication Theory 11th edition

Stakeholder 
Someone who shares should have access to the private information based on what they have the lose if the information is disclosed.</ref> A First Look at Communication Theory 11th edition

Deliberate Confident
Someone who was seeking out private information</ref> A first Look at Communication Theory 11th edition

Private boundaries 
To understand CPM theory it is important to follow the metaphor of the boundary. Private boundaries are the division between private information and public information. When private information is shared, there will be a collective boundary. When private information remains with an individual and is not disclosed, the boundary is called a personal boundary. An individual's private information is protected by their boundaries. The permeability of these boundaries are ever-changing. Boundaries can be relatively permeable (easy to cross) or relatively impregnable (rigid and difficult to cross).

Boundary coordination
An individual's private information is protected by the individual's boundaries. The permeability of these boundaries are ever-changing, and allow certain parts of the public access to certain pieces of information belonging to the individual. Sharing private information is a risky decision and puts the owner of the information in a vulnerable position. Therefore, rules surrounding the boundaries must be negotiated to protect the shared information. Once private information is shared, co-owners must coordinate the boundaries of privacy and disclosure based on boundary permeability, boundary linkage, and boundary ownership. Petronio describes this mutual boundary coordination by co-owners as drawing the same borders on a map around a shared piece of information. By no means is this an easy process considering that each owner will approach the information from distinct viewpoints and referencing their personal criteria for privacy rule development.  
Boundary permeability refers to the nature of the invisible divisions that keep private information from being known outside of an individual or particular group. When private information is kept with one owner, the boundaries are said to be thick because there is less possibility for information to make its way out into the public sphere. Once information is shared to one or more persons, the boundaries for that private information expand, become more permeable, and are considered thin.
Boundary linkage has to do with how owners are connected when they build associations through a boundary. For example, doctors and patients are linked to each other in such a way that private information is passed within their boundaries constantly. These linkages can be strong or weak depending on how information was shared or whether a co-owner wanted to know or was prepared to learn a new piece of information. Case in point, the link between an organization and a spy meant to infiltrate the organization is weak because the two are not coordinated on how information will be maintained private or disclosed.
Boundary ownership refers to the responsibilities and rights each person has over the control of the spread of information that they own. When working to mutually create the boundary of privacy it is key for all parties to have a clear understanding of whether information should be shared, who it should be shared with, and when it should be shared. A simple example of this is the planning of a surprise birthday party; all those involved in planning must agree on how the information about the party will be spread so as not to ruin the surprise. As new guests are invited, they become an owner of the information and are bound to the rules of privacy maintenance, or else the surprise could be ruined.
Fuzzy boundaries parts of confidential information that have not been discussed in a confidentiality agreement. one or both parties are not sure if that information can be shared with outside parties. Once information is known by others who are not the original owner they may have their own interpretation of how the information can be shared.</ref> A First Look at Communication Theory 11th edition

Boundary turbulence
Often, boundaries are not coordinated as well as they should be to maintain the level of privacy or exposure desired by owners – this leads to problems known as boundary turbulence. The coordination of shared boundaries is key to avoiding over-sharing. When the boundaries are unclear, owners may come into conflict with one another. Turbulence among co-owners is caused when rules are not mutually understood by co-owners and when the management of private information comes into conflict with the expectations each owner had, which can happen for a number of reasons.

Boundary turbulence can be caused by mistakes, such as an uninvited party overhearing private information (causing weak boundary linkage) or a disclosure an owner might make under the influence of alcohol or other drugs. Disclosure to a new party was not the intent, but, when it happens, other co-owners can feel that their expectations of maintaining boundaries have been violated.

In addition, boundary turbulence occurs when a co-owner intentionally breaks the coordinated boundary of privacy to disclose private information. An example of such intentional disclosure would be a daughter revealing to a doctor that her father is indeed an active smoker when the father has told the doctor that he no longer smokes after his heart surgery. The daughter in this case must weigh the risks of breaking the family privacy boundary against the benefits of the doctor being better informed of her father's condition.

Lastly, boundary turbulence can also occur when there have not been pre-existing rules for a situation. For example, with the emergence of social media and, in particular, Facebook, boundary rules had not been established. As parents began to join Facebook and "friend" their children, the children felt turbulence. There was a perception of privacy invasion between the parent-child relationship.

In cases of boundary turbulence, co-owners of information can feel that their expectations have been violated and lose trust in other co-owners. In these cases, the goal of each party is to reduce turbulence by reestablishing and coordinating boundaries. Turbulence doesn't always have a negative outcome, there has been studies which show that turbulence within relationships can lead to stronger and improved relationships. Boundary violations and boundary turbulence can be used as a learning opportunity for individuals to renegotiate existing boundaries or better form new boundaries in similar situations. Boundary turbulence is experienced differently by each individual, and reactions to violations can depend on how many new boundary linkages are created and how many new people the private information reaches. These factors can determine whether boundary turbulence can cause distress to a relationship or be a learning experience.

Control and ownership 
Communication privacy management theory understands information (as well as boundaries) as something that is owned, and each owner must decide whether or not they are willing to have a confidant, i.e. a co-owner malparida piroba, to that information. In some cases, it is preferable for the owner to have another person share the private information, though this may not be the case for the confidant. Co-ownership of information is characterized by two things: heavy responsibility and a knowledge of the rules for a particular disclosure. However, ownership can be felt to different degrees, and the understanding of disclosure rules can be different from owner to owner. Also, the act of sharing is coupled along with the realization that boundaries have expanded and that they may never return to their original state. It is the responsibility of co-owners to decide and make clear if, when, and how information can or should be shared with others. Sometimes it's not all 50/50 in confidentiality agreement. For instance, if you are at a barber shop sharing your life story with the person cutting your hair they may not feel as much pressure to hold up their end of the disclosure agreement since they barley know you. However, a counselor who is bound by law to not leak private information will not be a risk to breach that trust.

Rule-based management system

Petronio views boundary management as a rule based process, not an individual decision. This rule-based management system allows for management on the individual and collective levels. This system depends on three privacy rule management to regulate the process of revealing and concealing private information: privacy rule characteristics, boundary coordination, and boundary turbulence.

Privacy rule characteristics 
The characteristics of privacy rules are divided into two sections, attributes and development. Privacy rule attributes refer to how people obtain rules of privacy and understand the properties of those rules. This is normally done through social interactions where the boundaries for rules are put to the test. Rules are set in different social situations which dictate the type of disclosure that should be made, for example, the difference between disclosure at a family member's birthday party versus an office event at work. Petronio asserts that each situation will come with its own set of rules for managing privacy that are learned over time. The development of privacy rule characteristics has to do with the criteria implemented to decide if and how information will be shared. Communication privacy management theory general lists those criteria as the following:

With these five criteria, personal and group privacy rules are developed, but disclosure of private information necessitates the inclusion of others within the boundary of knowledge, which demands an understanding between parties for how to coordinate ownership of knowledge.

Management dialectics 
Petronio's understanding and argument of privacy management rests on the idea that a dialectic exists wherever the decision is made to disclose or conceal private information. Thus, costs and benefits must be weighed and consideration must be given to how such information will be owned, used, and spread. The definition of dialectic that Petronio borrows from can be found in Leslie Baxter and Barbara Montgomery's theory of relational dialectics, wherein various approaches to the contradictory impulses of relational life are discussed. The theory focuses on the idea that there are not only two contradictory stances within a relationship, were weighed using multiple viewpoints.

Theory applications 
To validate the effectiveness and feasibility of the Communication Privacy Management theoretical frameworks, Petronio tested them using different methods including and not limited to qualitative and quantitative research. These approaches helped other researchers translate research into practice in different fields and enabled CPM to be applied across different contexts, primarily include: (1) family communication, with a particular focus on parental privacy invasions, (2) online social media, (3) health, and (4) relational issues, and (5) work environments.

Family communication

Specific applications of CPM highlight family privacy management. Research focused on secrets and topic avoidance, such as questions of concealment to stepfamily members feeling caught, and parents-adolescent conversations about sex. Family privacy research over the decades are also inspired specifically by the chapter of parental privacy invasion. For example, work by Hawk and his colleagues explore perceived parental invasions from the view of adolescents in reaction to such issues as control attempts, solicitation of information, and conflict outcomes. Another way that family communication uses CPM is with child bearing or the lack thereof; whom childless-couples choose to disclose to that they voluntarily do not want children is another way CPM has been explored.

Pregnancy loss due to miscarriage could be a unique CPM case in the family setting as couples often manage this information jointly as they decide whether to share the miscarriage with people outside the dyad. The research found that couples frame miscarriage as a shared but distinct experience and that both members exert rights of ownership over the information. Couples' privacy rules centered on issues of social support and others' need to know about the loss. Even though couples described their privacy rules as implicitly understood, they also recalled having explicit conversations to develop rules. We discuss how the management of co-owned information can improve communication and maintain relationships.

Online social media
Recent researchers apply CPM to investigate privacy management for online blogging, Facebook usage and online dating. Further, there have been investigations into parental behavior that is enacted through online social media; specifically when parents 'friend' their children and the management of privacy that ensues from that. Privacy practices in social network sites often appear paradoxical, as content-sharing behavior stands in conflict with the need to reduce disclosure-related harms. Some study explore privacy in social network sites as a contextual information practice, managed by a process of boundary regulation. Disclosing private information online functions differently than disclosing private information in face to face instances. The mediated nature of social media means that it can be harder to control who sees what information and how that information can be spread. Thus, it's harder to control boundaries and linkage. Trust and risk management become important factors in sharing information online.

As social media continues to develop and become an essential part in everyday life, more younger audiences are attuned to how much information is under surveillance. Surveillance from family, schools and potential employers means individuals can't fully control the boundaries and co-owners of their private information, which has implications for what is shared and how individuals present themselves online.

Facebook 
Since Facebook is one of the most popular social media platforms of our time, many researchers employed Communication Privacy Management theory as a theoretical framework to examine the individual boundary management practices and privacy concerns of self-disclosure on this important platform. Sandra Petronio herself together with other researchers used CPM to study young adults’ tendencies to manage their privacy and communicate on Facebook with different generations of family members. A number of 383 respondents participated in a survey concerning their online and offline Facebook communication with other family members. The study found that young adults share their information mainly with their siblings followed by their parents and finally their grandparents. Another case study analyzing the responses of 240 participants revealed that the communication privacy practices by individuals using Facebook strongly impact the “amount and depth” of their self-disclosure. One more study explored how colleagues in the professional context respond to friend requests from other co-workers. The study provided evidence that co-workers' connection on Facebook improves only when each party understands the rules which govern privacy management. In an exploratory study on privacy management in two social media platforms, Facebook and Snapchat, showed that Facebook users are less likely to share their private information compared to users of other social media platforms. However, another study found that Facebook subscribers are more open and willing to share their private information with distant friends rather than the close ones. These examples demonstrate how Facebook users are aware of the fact that they don't have full control over the ownership of their information and this affects their decisions on what and how to share on Facebook.

Blogging 
Jeffrey T. Child, Judy C. Pearson and Sandra Petronio have used CPM to develop the Blogging Privacy Management Measure (BPPM), a model through which researchers can look at privacy management in blogging specifically. Because blogging is a mediated activity, the BPPM can be used to look at the implications of online blog disclosures, such as when the privacy boundaries are misinterpreted by readers. A study using the BPPM found that young bloggers were likely to reveal more private information online rather than in person, because the medium gives more control. Bloggers who had "higher self-monitoring skills" tended to be more private and careful with their disclosures. Bloggers with a high "concern for appropriateness" tended to curate the perfect desired image of who they wanted to be online, and disclosed private information to fit that image.

Similar research has been done on the perceptions of teachers' disclosures on Facebook and their impact on credibility. The relevance and valence of disclosures were compared between disclosures made in the classroom and those made on Facebook and were found to be significantly different. Students' perceptions of teacher credibility were shown to decrease as relevance of disclosures increased and as negativity increased.

Twitter 
Another popular SNS, Twitter, was examined as well. In the research, Twitter was regarded as an onion with multiple privacy layers. The research found out that there were significant differences at the descriptive and inferential levels among the multiple dimensions of private information, including daily lives, social identity, competence, socio-economic status, and health. Private information regarding daily lives and entertainment was disclosed easily and located at the outermost layer of the disclosure onion. In contrast, health-related private information was concealed and located within the innermost layer of the disclosure onion. What's more, there were significant differences among current Twitter users, nonusers, and dropouts with regard to personality traits and privacy concerns about Twitter.

Young people, especially high school and college students, are an important part of SNS users. A recent study examined college students' privacy concerns and impacts on their Twitter usage behaviors. Regression analyses concluded that Control and Boundary Rules of Private Information on Twitter significantly predict daily minutes spent on Twitter accounts. However, the same CPM variables did not predict college students' other Twitter usage behaviors (e.g., weekly inquiries and total months of using Twitter). This shows the intricate connection between students' privacy concern and their usage behavior.

Health communication 

Informed by principles of CPM, health communication research using CPM to explore health privacy issues has become a growth area. Earlier study investigated physician disclosure of medical mistakes. Recently there have been a number of studies focused on ways that privacy issues influence patient care, confidentiality and control over ownership, choices about disclosure, for instance, with stigmatized health-related illness such as HIV/AIDS, e-health information, reproductive information, and the digitization of healthcare.

One recent study about how overweight and obese individuals handle their personal history after they become a normal weight. The result shows that the vast majority of participants perceived more benefits from disclosing their larger identity than risks, regardless of weight-loss method.

Trust in health care providers is an important factor in determining whether a patient is comfortable disclosing private health information. In a health context, race may be a core factor in whether or not a patient trusts medical professionals, and race can impact how privacy rules between an individual and a doctor develop.

Using CPM, Celebrity Health Narratives & the Public Health offers the "first extensive look at celebrity health sagas, this book examines the ways in which their stories become our stories, influencing public perception and framing dialog about wellness, disease and death. These private-yet-public narratives drive fund-raising, reduce stigma and influence policy. Celebrities such as Mary Tyler Moore, Robin Roberts, Michael J. Fox, and Christopher Reeve—as well as 200 others included in the study—have left a lasting legacy."

Health related situations can include a "forced disclosure" incident, such as when young adults are still under their parents' health insurance plans and do not have full control over what private health information is shared. Because the parents support their child financially by paying for insurance, individuals can feel that parents have a right to this information. For those that feel that health information should solely be under the ownership of the individual, boundary turbulence can occur.

Relationship issues

Many studies emphasize the use of CPM in relationships because of the concepts of disclosure and boundaries. Not only romantic relationships, but also friendships are a factor when thinking of CPM. Disclosures in friendships have been studied because of how important friendships are to one's identity, especially at a young age. When a person is unable to disclose information to friends or loved ones, it can exacerbate issues because they do not feel supported. Thus, researchers use CPM to understand why and how private disclosures happen in friendships. Briefly, work on conflict and topic avoidance, considering the relational impact of privacy turbulence, students and faculty relationships, and workplace relationships have all produced useful information that opens new doors regarding CPM-based research.

The mobile phone and its impact on romantic relationships is a good example. After investigating mobile phone usage rules that are negotiated by adolescents and young adults in romantic relationships, findings are that the negotiation of rules is a crucial part of young adult relationships while enhancing trust and fostering harmony were important factors in the rule development process.

CPM also appears in the friendship. The study intended to addresses the issue of whether personal traits and predispositions can predict the tendencies to either reveal or conceal secrets shared in confidence by a best friend suggested that a combination of several traits could successfully distinguish those who revealed secrets from those who did not. Significant discriminators included tendency to gossip and depth of disclosure. Implications of the study and suggestions for future research are discussed.

Although privacy violations can be uncomfortable and disruptive, they have the potential for positive outcomes in relationships if addressed. Using CPM theory as a framework, a study surveyed a community sample of 273 adults to examine their retrospective accounts of privacy violations in personal relationships. Results showed that less than half of the sample offered explicit rules for information management, and the majority of participants blamed the confidant for the privacy turbulence. Findings indicated that people often do not share similar information with the violator in the future, but if they do, less than half offer explicit privacy rules during the privacy recalibration process. Confrontation efficacy was positively associated with initiating a conversation about the privacy turbulence and that people who engaged in privacy recalibration were more likely to report forgiveness and relational improvement and less likely to report relational damage than those individuals who did not.

Work environments

CPM has become very applicable in the workplace as personal mobile devices have increasingly been allowed to be brought to work. The concept of Bring Your Own Device (BYOD) has stirred conversation on the concept of privacy, security and boundaries between employee and employer. Companies have had to take measures to further secure their network or even decide whether they want to have employee access personal accounts (i.e. email) or devices while on the job. By the same token, some employees argue that companies should not be able to track what is being done on their personal devices or even on company computers even if they are in the work place.
Even before stepping foot into the workplace, much can be said about CPM and interviewing. How much we decide to reveal within an interview and the boundaries we have in that situation is directly related to CPM. Even interviewing within a job (as a cop, for example) requires a certain sensitivity to people's boundaries and how much private information they are willing to reveal.

Intercultural communication 
Several studies tested CPM within intercultural contexts.  For instance, a study that examined intercultural privacy management between foreign English teachers and Japanese co-workers uncovered cultural premises. This "study highlights four cultural premises that garner intercultural privacy management between foreign English language teachers (ELTs) and Japanese coworkers (JCWs) in Japan. The analysis revealed that ELTs: (a) expected not to be a "free space" for privacy inquisition by JCWs, and (b) expected voluntary reciprocity in (egalitarian) workplace relationships. JCWs viewed: (a) privacy inquisitions as acts of kindness/caring and (b) soliciting help from a supervisor as providing opportunities for better care. This study calls for attention to intercultural privacy management and enhances CPM's cultural criteria."  Within the same context, foreign English teachers "employed the following management strategies: (a) withdrawal, (b) cognitive restructuring, (c) independent control, (d) lying, (e) omission, (f) avoidance, and (g) gaijin smashing. Japanese co-workers defined privacy as information that should be hidden and managed such information by: (a) drawing clear boundaries by not talking or changing contexts, and (b) being pre-emptive by demarcating privacy boundaries early on within a relationship."

Cultural differences are often tied to relationships, and a can move beyond differences of ethnicity or gender. A 2020 study looked at how CPM functions in mixed orientation marriages, where a heterosexual presenting couple is actually made up of one heterosexual partner and one partner who does not identify as heterosexual. Disclosure of one's sexuality often was an identity-affirming action, as an outsider would not be able to tell otherwise what the partners' sexualities were. After a disclosure, couples were found to manage boundaries for the owned private information in several ways: Inclusive, intersected, interrelated or unified. Dominic Pecoraro also studied privacy management among members of the LGBT community, and included performative face theory and facework into his paradigm of why, when and how queer individuals disclose their sexual identities. Public disclosure via "coming out" normalizes different sexual identities, providing resistance to face threats due to heteronormativity.

Identity plays a large part in disclosure of religion as well. A 2020 study on how and why employees disclose their religious views when they were a part of a minority religion found that employees who felt like their religion was a core part of their identity were more likely to share that part of themselves with their coworkers, because religion was central to their identity.

Related theories 
There are a few communication theories that are worth noting after understanding CPM in more depth.

Expectancy violations theory discusses the importance of personal space, territoriality and the expectations individuals have of another's non verbal communication. Though dealing with physical proximity, we can see the relation between expectancy violations theory and CPM as it pertains to privacy and how close we allow another to come to us. Both physical and intimate proximity requires boundaries to be crossed or permeated.

Social penetration theory explains how two individuals grow in intimacy and move from one level to the next in their relationships. The popular idea behind social penetration is that individual are like onions; they have layers and as you go deeper, the more intimate you become. For this intimacy to occur, we can safely say that private information needs to be shared and exchanged. As one does this, boundaries are permeated and become co-owned.

Finally, coordinated management of meaning explains how people establish rules for both creating and interpreting meaning. Similar to CPM, coordinated management of meaning has stages were coordination is achieved, not achieved, or partially achieved. Similarly you can have boundary ownership, boundary turbulence or boundary linkage. Moreover, in order to achieve meaning there needs to be an exchange of information between individuals to decipher. This exchange of private information falls directly into CPM.

Academic integration
Communication privacy management theory utilizes a socio-cultural communication tradition within an interpersonal context, and employs both a positivistic and interpretive approach to knowing.

Critique

Values 

Altman speaks to the values of this theory as it advances our thinking by incorporating different "levels" or combinations of participants in communication processes (Altman 2002). Whereas earlier research and theorizing on privacy-disclosure focused on dyads or individuals, a most complicated set of dynamics has been carefully enunciated by Petronio. Petronio also describes communication within families and between family members and outsiders, within and outside work and social groups, and between many combinations of individuals, dyads, and others within and across social boundaries. In addition, her analysis of privacy-disclosure "turbulence", or breaches of desired communication patterns, is articulate and systematic.

Criticism 
Some researchers have questioned whether CPM theory truly is dialectical in nature.  It has argued that CPM takes a dualistic approach, treating privacy and disclosure as independent of one another and able to coexist in tandem rather than in the dynamic interplay characteristic of dialectics. This accusation of dualistic thinking might result from the theory's use of the terms balance and equilibrium in the early versions of CPM theory. Petronio argues that CPM is not focused on balance in the psychological sense. "Instead, [CPM] argues for coordination with others that does not advocate an optimum balance between disclosure and privacy. As an alternative, the theory claims there are shifting forces with a range of privacy and disclosure that people handle by making judgments about the degrees [emphasis in original] of privacy and publicness they wish to experience in any given interaction" (pp. 12–13). Thus, Petronio argues that it is legitimate to call CPM theory dialectical in nature. While boundary ownership is discussed throughout the theory there is no remedy provided for those who break boundary ownership rules. In addition CPM does not offer ways on how to negotiate boundaries between two parties, only that they must be done mutually.

See also 
Privacy
Self-disclosure

References 

Serewicz, Mary Claire Morr. “Introducing the Special Issue on Communication Privacy Management Theory and Family Privacy Regulation.” Journal of Family Communication., vol. 13, no. 1, 2013, pp. 2–5, https://doi.org/10.1080/15267431.2013.743424.

Griffin, Em, et al. A first Look at Communication Theory. 11th ed.

Privacy management theory
Interpersonal communication
Privacy